The women's high jump event at the 2015 African Games was held on 14 September.

Results

References

High
2015 in women's athletics